Orion Metal Exchange is a precious metals exchange based in Los Angeles, California, United States.  Jacob Blalock is the current chief executive officer of the company.

It provides services in precious metals such as gold, silver, platinum, and palladium. Orion also provides storage vaults service for safe storage of precious metals such as residential safe storage and off-site depository.

It provides precious metals IRAs such as Gold and Silver individual retirement accounts (IRAs) as an alternative to volatile stocks for retiring individuals.

History
It was founded in 2017.

References 

Commodity exchanges in the United States